Donald Anthony Perkins (March 4, 1938 – June 9, 2022) was an American professional football player who was a fullback in the National Football League (NFL) for the Dallas Cowboys. He played college football at the University of New Mexico.

Early years
Born and raised in Waterloo, Iowa, Perkins earned eight letters for Waterloo West High School, four each in football and track (sprinter). He also played basketball. Perkins captained the track team by the time he was a junior.

In 1955, his football team went undefeated and Perkins made the first All-state team as a halfback, while playing both offense and defense. He was president of the student body during his senior year.

College career
Perkins played college football at the University of New Mexico in Albuquerque, where he played halfback and defensive back as a two-way player. He was a three-time All-Skyline selection and the Skyline Sophomore of the Year. In 1958, he led the nation in kickoff returns. In 1959 he received third-team All-American honors.

The head coach at New Mexico was future Hall of Famer Marv Levy, who has stated in several occasions that Perkins was one of the greatest players he ever coached. He also mentioned him in his Hall of Fame induction speech in Canton, Ohio.

Perkins set 12 records as a three-year halfback starter. The school retired his number (43) when he completed his career – a first in UNM history. He ranks 14th in the Lobos' career rushing list with 2,001 yards. He was inducted into the New Mexico Sports Hall of Fame and the University of New Mexico Hall of Honor.

Professional career
The Dallas Cowboys franchise was admitted to the league too late to participate in the 1960 NFL draft in November 1959, so they signed Perkins to a personal-services contract for a $1,500 bonus and a $10,000 salary. This meant he would play for the Cowboys if and when they received an NFL franchise. Although he was selected in the ninth round of the NFL draft by the Baltimore Colts, the league honored the contract, but made the Cowboys compensate the Colts with a ninth-round draft pick (#116-Roy Walker) in the 1962 NFL draft.

Perkins sat out the entire 1960 season with a broken foot (fifth metatarsal) he suffered in training camp, so he began playing with the Cowboys in 1961 as a rookie. He lacked long-distance speed, but made up for it with outstanding quickness and balance. He finished with 815 rushing yards (sixth among league leaders) and 4 touchdowns, earning NFL rookie of the year and Pro Bowl honors.

Not only was Perkins considered a superb blocker, he also finished in the NFL's top 10 rushing in each of his eight seasons in the league. On September 24, 1961, he became the first running back in Cowboys' history to run for 100 yards in a game, when he rushed for 108 yards on 17 carries against the expansion Minnesota Vikings.

Perkins's best year was in 1962, when he rushed for 945 yards and seven touchdowns, becoming the first Cowboy to make the All-Pro team. He was coming off his two best all-around seasons when he decided to retire prior to the 1969 season.

He ranks fourth on the Cowboys' all-time rushing yards list (behind Emmitt Smith, Tony Dorsett, and Ezekiel Elliott), and fifth on the rushing touchdowns list, behind Smith, Dorsett, Marion Barber III, and Elliott. He was selected to six Pro Bowls and to one All-Pro team, while gaining a reputation in the NFL for his courage and resolve on some of worst teams in Dallas Cowboys history. In 1968, he helped end the Cowboys practice of segregating players when traveling to hotels.

"Perkins was in the toughest times", Tom Landry once told NFL Films: "The guy was a remarkable runner, a great pass blocker and one of the best players in our history." Walt Garrison, who replaced him in the starting lineup, once said, "Don Perkins was the best fullback the Dallas Cowboys ever had".

Perkins retired at the end of 1968 having led all active players in rushing yards since the retirement of Jim Taylor, and was fifth in NFL history with 6,217. He was inducted into the Ring of Honor at Texas Stadium alongside his quarterback Don Meredith in 1976. Only Bob Lilly was inducted ahead of them, in 1975.

In 2006, he was inducted into the Texas Sports Hall of Fame.

The Professional Football Researchers Association named Perkins to the PRFA Hall of Very Good Class of 2016

Personal life and death
Perkins was a football analyst for CBS Sports, ABC Sports, and other television and radio networks. He was the director of the Work Incentive Program for the State of New Mexico Department of Human Services from 1972 to 1985. He served on both the Executive board of US West and the Board of Trustees for University Hospital from 1990 to 1993. He was a member of the Northwest Mesa Branch of the NAACP.

A father of four children and grandfather of eleven, Perkins was active in local theater, public speaking, and broadcasting at the local and national levels.  He retired in the city of Albuquerque.

Perkins died June 9, 2022 at the age of 84.

See also
 List of NCAA major college yearly punt and kickoff return leaders

References

External links
 
 Dallas Cowboys Ring of Honor bio
 Dallas Cowboys Top 50 players
 New Mexico Lobos bio

1938 births
2022 deaths
Sportspeople from Waterloo, Iowa
Players of American football from Iowa
African-American players of American football
American football fullbacks
New Mexico Lobos football players
Eastern Conference Pro Bowl players
Dallas Cowboys players
College football announcers
National Football League announcers
21st-century African-American people
20th-century African-American sportspeople